This Milestone, carved in 1790, is a historic milestone at the intersection of Appleton Street and Paul Revere Road in Arlington, Massachusetts. The road was realigned (to roughly the current alignment of Massachusetts Avenue) in 1811, bypassing the marker. It was moved slightly during road works in 1940, and now sits in a triangular island in the intersection.

The marker was listed on the National Register of Historic Places in 1985.

See also
1767 Milestones
Haverhill Street Milestone in Reading, Massachusetts
National Register of Historic Places listings in Arlington, Massachusetts

References

Arlington, Massachusetts
Geography of Middlesex County, Massachusetts
Historical markers in the United States
Milestones
National Register of Historic Places in Arlington, Massachusetts
Transportation buildings and structures in Middlesex County, Massachusetts